The Canton of Doudeville is a former canton situated in the Seine-Maritime département and in the Haute-Normandie region of northern France. It was disbanded following the French canton reorganisation which came into effect in March 2015. It consisted of 17 communes, which joined the canton of Yvetot in 2015. It had a total of 8,220 inhabitants (2012).

Geography 
A farmland area in the arrondissement of Rouen, centred on the town of Doudeville. The altitude varies from 75m (Hautot-Saint-Sulpice) to 167m (Amfreville-les-Champs)  with an average altitude of 135m.

The canton comprised 17 communes:

Amfreville-les-Champs
Bénesville
Berville
Boudeville
Bretteville-Saint-Laurent
Canville-les-Deux-Églises
Doudeville
Étalleville
Fultot
Gonzeville
Harcanville
Hautot-Saint-Sulpice
Prétot-Vicquemare
Reuville
Saint-Laurent-en-Caux
Le Torp-Mesnil
Yvecrique

Population

See also 
 Arrondissements of the Seine-Maritime department
 Cantons of the Seine-Maritime department
 Communes of the Seine-Maritime department

References

Doudeville
2015 disestablishments in France
States and territories disestablished in 2015